The Zero Bridge is an old wooden arch bridge located in the city of Srinagar in the Indian union territory of Jammu and Kashmir. It crosses the Jhelum river in a roughly North-South direction connecting Sonwar in the north to Rajbagh in the South. Originally constructed in the late 1950s under the then prime minister Bakshi Ghulam Mohammad, the bridge was closed for vehicular traffic in the late 1980s owing to the weakening of its wooden structure.

Etymology 
Officially it is said to have been named Zero Bridge since traditionally the Amira Kadal bridge was regarded as the first bridge on the Jhelum as it entered Srinagar and the Zero bridge preceded this 'first' bridge.

Current Status 

The Zero Bridge is still the first bridge downstream of the Jhelum while entering the Srinagar city and the next upstream crossing is located near Pantha Chowk in the city outskirts. At present, the old wooden structure of the bridge is being replaced by a new one, preserving the original architecture and the bridge would continue to be a pedestrian crossing and a heritage site. The vehicular traffic is currently handled by the Abdullah Bridge, located roughly 200 metres downstream.

References 

Bridges in Srinagar
Buildings and structures in Srinagar
Bridges over the Jhelum River
Bridges in Jammu and Kashmir
Wooden bridges
Arch bridges
Bridges completed in the 20th century
Wooden buildings and structures in India
Transport in Srinagar
20th-century architecture in India